Wayne Township is one of the twelve townships of Champaign County, Ohio, United States. As of the 2010 census the population was 1,809.

Geography
Located in the northeastern part of the county, it borders the following townships:
Zane Township, Logan County - northeast
Rush Township - east
Goshen Township - southeast corner
Union Township - south
Salem Township - west
Monroe Township, Logan County - northwest

No municipalities are located in Wayne Township, although two unincorporated communities lie in the township: Cable in the center, and Mingo in the north.

Name and history
It is one of twenty Wayne Townships statewide.

Wayne Township was established in 1828 from land given by Rush Township.

Government
The township is governed by a three-member board of trustees, who are elected in November of odd-numbered years to a four-year term beginning on the following January 1. Two are elected in the year after the presidential election and one is elected in the year before it. There is also an elected township fiscal officer, who serves a four-year term beginning on April 1 of the year after the election, which is held in November of the year before the presidential election. Vacancies in the fiscal officership or on the board of trustees are filled by the remaining trustees.

References

External links
County website
County and township map of Ohio

Townships in Champaign County, Ohio
Townships in Ohio